Pahlavan may refer to:

Sports
 Varzesh-e Pahlavani, traditional Iranian wrestling
 Pehlwani, traditional Indian wrestling
 Pehlivan, traditional Turkish wrestling

Places
 Pahlavan, Iran, a village in West Azerbaijan Province, Iran
 Pahlavan, Sistan and Baluchestan, a village in Sistan and Baluchestan Province, Iran

People 
 Ali Pahlavan (born 1975), Iranian musician, singer-songwriter, lyricist and composer
 Kaveh Pahlavan (born 1951), professor at Worcester Polytechnic Institute, Worcester, Massachusetts

Other 
 Pahlavan (Iranian title)
 Jahan Pahlavan, Iranian title like Pahlavan
 Pahlevan of Iran
 Parthians, an ancient people in Iran
 Pahlavuni, Armenian noble family
 Pahlavani language, extinct variety of Persian
 Pehlewani, older form of Southern Kurdish

See also
 Pahlavi (disambiguation)